Bathpool is a small village in the civil parish of North Hill in east Cornwall, England. It is situated in the River Lynher valley on the southeast fringe of Bodmin Moor, about five miles (8 kilometres) northwest of Callington.

See also

Stara Woods

Footnotes

External links

Villages in Cornwall